Neodymium(II) iodide or neodymium diiodide is an inorganic salt of iodine and neodymium the formula NdI2. Neodymium uses the +2 oxidation state in the compound.

Neodymium(II) iodide is a violet solid. The compound is not stoichiometric. It melts at 562°C.

Preparation
Neodymium(II) iodide can be made by heating molten neodymium(III) iodide with neodymium metal at 800 and 580°C for 12 hours. It can also be obtained by reducing neodymium(III) iodide with neodymium in a vacuum at 800 to 900°C:

Nd + 2NdI3 → 3NdI2

The reaction of neodymium with mercury(II) iodide is also possible because neodymium is more reactive than mercury:

Nd + HgI2 → NdI2 + Hg

Direct preparation from iodine and neodymium is also possible:

Nd + I2 → NdI2

The compound was first synthesized by John D. Corbett in 1961.

Properties
Neodymium(II) iodide is a violet solid. The compound is extremely hygroscopic, and can only be stored and handled under carefully dried inert gas or under a high vacuum. In air it converts into hydrates by absorbing moisture, but these are unstable and more or less rapidly transform into oxide iodides with the evolution of hydrogen:

2NdI2 + 2H2O → 2NdOI + H2↑ + 2HI

Neodymium(II) iodide is not stoichiometric, and has a formula of closer to NdI1.95. It melts at 562°C. It has a strontium(II) bromide-type crystal structure. Under pressure, this transforms into the molybdenum disilicide structure typically seen in intermetallic compound, which is already present under normal conditions in other rare earth diiodides (e.g. praseodymium(II) iodide and lanthanum(II) iodide). It forms complexes with tetrahydrofuran and other organic compounds.

Neodymium(II) iodide is an electrical insulator.

Reactions
Neodymium(II) iodide reacts with organohalides by extracting the halogen, resulting in dimers, oligomers or reactions with the solvent.

Solvates are known with tetrahydrofuran and dimethoxyethane: NdI2(THF)2 and NdI2(DME)2.

Neodymium(II) iodide reduces hot nitrogen to form an iodide nitride: (NdI2)3N which with THF also gives (NdI)3N2.

It reacts with cyclopentadiene in THF to give CpNdI2(THF)3.

Applications
Neodymium(II) iodide can be used as a reducing agent or catalyst in organic chemistry.

See also
 Neodymium(III) iodide
 Lanthanide

References 

Neodymium compounds
Iodides
Lanthanide halides